
Werner Hühner (13 August 1886 – 10 February 1966) was a general in the armed forces of Germany during World War II who commanded several divisions. He was a recipient of the Knight's Cross of the Iron Cross.

Awards and decorations

 Knight's Cross of the Iron Cross on 18 April 1943 as generalleutnant and commander of 61st Infantry Division

References

Citations

Bibliography

 

1886 births
1966 deaths
People from Celle (district)
Lieutenant generals of the German Army (Wehrmacht)
German Army personnel of World War I
Recipients of the Gold German Cross
Recipients of the Knight's Cross of the Iron Cross
German prisoners of war in World War II held by the United Kingdom
People from the Province of Hanover
Recipients of the clasp to the Iron Cross, 1st class
Military personnel from Lower Saxony
German Army generals of World War II